Nahon is a surname. Notable people with the surname include:

Alice Nahon (1896–1933), Belgian poet
Cecilia Nahón (born 1974), Argentine economist, diplomat, and politician
Chris Nahon (born 1968), French film director
Karine Nahon (born 1972), Israeli information scientist
Leon Nahon (born 1938), South African water polo player
Marlene Hassan-Nahon (born 1976), Gibraltarian politician
Philippe Nahon (born 1938), French actor